is a commuter railway station on the Enoshima Electric Railway (Enoden) located in the city of Fujisawa, Kanagawa Prefecture, Japan.

Lines
Enoshima Station is served by the Enoshima Electric Railway Main Line and is 3.3 kilometers from the terminus of the line at Fujisawa Station. The Enoden tracks run on the vehicular road between this station and Koshigoe Station.

Station layout
The station consists of two opposed side platforms serving two ground-level tracks. The tracks are connected to the station building via a level crossing.

Platforms

History 
It was renamed Enoshima Station in 1929. The current station building was rebuilt in 1999.

Station numbering was introduced to the Enoshima Electric Railway January 2014 with Enoshima being assigned station number EN06.

Passenger statistics
In fiscal 2019, the station was used by an average of 10,097 passengers daily, making it the 3rd used of the 15 Enoden stations 

The passenger figures for previous years are as shown below.

Surrounding area and transfer
  Katase-Enoshima Station (Odakyu Enoshima Line)
  Shonan-Enoshima Station (Shonan Monorail)
 Enoshima
Enoshima Aquarium
Katase Higashihama beach
Katase Nishihama / Kugenuma Beach
 Shonan Shirayuri Gakuen Elementary School

Popular culture 
 This railway station was shown in the 5th episode of anime A Channel, where main characters were going to the sea by Enoshima Electric Railway Line Train, and were arguing about "it is train or tram".

See also
 List of railway stations in Japan

References

External links

 Enoden Station information 

Railway stations in Kanagawa Prefecture
Railway stations in Japan opened in 1902
Railway stations in Fujisawa, Kanagawa